Yangiyer ( — new land) — is a city in Sirdaryo Region, Eastern Uzbekistan. It is a district-level city. Its population is 44,200 (2021).

Etymology 
The name of the city is translated from Uzbek as "new land".

History 
It was established in 1957 as part of the grand Soviet project to cultivate the naturally saline virgin lands of Mirzachoʻl, a vast area of about 10,000 square kilometres in Eastern Uzbekistan. The shortage of irrigation water was the main problem hindering the development of agriculture in the area.

Economy 
The city has several plants including a plant of building materials, pipe plant, asphalt plant.

Yangier also has a branch of Tashkent Institute of Agriculture and Irrigation Engineering, a college of civil engineering and a museum dedicated to cultivation of virgin lands of Mirzachoʻl

References

Populated places in Sirdaryo Region
Cities in Uzbekistan
Cities and towns built in the Soviet Union
Populated places established in 1957